Jenningston is an unincorporated community in Tucker County, West Virginia, United States.

References

Unincorporated communities in Tucker County, West Virginia
Unincorporated communities in West Virginia